The John Tanner House is a stone house located in Petersburg, Kentucky, United States, built around 1810.  It is the oldest stone house existing in Boone County.  It is located on Route 20 East.

It was built by John Tanner, the first Baptist preacher in Kentucky, who founded the community, originally called Tanner's Station, which became Petersburg in 1814.

References

National Register of Historic Places in Boone County, Kentucky
Houses in Boone County, Kentucky
Houses on the National Register of Historic Places in Kentucky
1810 establishments in Kentucky
Houses completed in 1810
Federal architecture in Kentucky